Claro River is a small town in the southeast of Trinidad, known only by its name in Spanish, Rio Claro.

Transport 

Up until the 1960s it served as the terminus of a branch line of the Trinidad Government Railway.

See also 

 Railway stations in Trinidad and Tobago

References

External links 

Populated places in Trinidad and Tobago